OGC may refer to:

 Oculogyric crisis, a dystonic reaction to certain drugs and/or medical conditions
 Office of Government Commerce, a department of the government of the United Kingdom
 O.G.C. (band), a hip hop group from Brooklyn, New York
 OGC Nice French association football club based in Nice
 Open Geospatial Consortium, a standards organization for geospatial information systems
 Oregon Graduate Center, a private college in suburban Portland, Oregon
 Organic Christ Generation, a sect in Switzerland
 Organically Grown Company (Oregon), an organic produce wholesale company

See also